Brandon Edwin Cruz (born May 28, 1962) is an American actor and singer best known for his role as Eddie Corbett, son of widower Tom Corbett (played by Bill Bixby) on the television series The Courtship of Eddie's Father. Cruz is also a punk rock musician, having sung for bands such as Dr. Know and the reunited version of the Dead Kennedys.

Early life and career
Cruz was born in Bakersfield, California and moved to Silver Strand Beach in Ventura County, California with his family at the age of two months. At age five, he auditioned for and won his breakthrough role as Eddie Corbett in the television series The Courtship of Eddie's Father, which aired from 1969 to 1972. Bixby and Cruz spent considerable time together, especially when the show was on hiatus, prompting Cruz to tell American Profile magazine "Bill Bixby was like my second father."

Cruz continued as a child actor for several years following the cancellation of The Courtship of Eddie's Father with a number of guest appearances in television shows like Kung Fu, Gunsmoke, and The Incredible Hulk—which reunited him on-screen with Bixby. Cruz also played the role of Joey Turner in the 1976 movie The Bad News Bears.

Cruz turned his attention to punk rock in the late 1970s, and in 1981, was performing with the Hardcore punk band Dr. Know. The group released several records, and after a name change to KNOW, toured Europe in 2017. Cruz also was the lead vocalist with Dead Kennedys from 2001 until 2003. Cruz was interviewed in the documentary American Hardcore: The History of American Punk Rock, 1980–1986. Reflecting on life after being a child star, which has brought tragedy to so many others, Cruz told American Profile "Surfing and punk rock probably saved my life."

In 1991, Cruz was honored by the Young Artist Foundation with its Former Child Star "Lifetime Achievement" Award for his role as Eddie on The Courtship of Eddie's Father. He has also worked behind-the-scenes in television as an assistant editor on the animated series South Park.

Filmography

References

External links
 

1962 births
American male child actors
American male singers
American punk rock singers
Dead Kennedys members
Living people
Male actors from Bakersfield, California
Musicians from Oxnard, California
20th-century American singers
21st-century American singers
Singers from California